The 2004 Cincinnati Masters (also known as the Western & Southern Financial Group Masters and Western & Southern Financial Group Women's Open for sponsorship reasons) was a tennis tournament played on outdoor hard courts. It was the 103rd edition of the Cincinnati Masters, and was part of the ATP Masters Series of the 2004 ATP Tour, and of the Tier III Series of the 2004 WTA Tour. Both the men's and the women's events took place at the Lindner Family Tennis Center in Mason, near Cincinnati, Ohio, United States. It was the first Cincinnati event to feature both men and women's draws since 1989.

Finals

Men's singles

 Andre Agassi defeated  Lleyton Hewitt, 6–3, 3–6, 6–2
It was Andre Agassi's 9th title of the year, and his 31st overall. It was his 4th Masters title of the year and his 8th overall.

Women's singles

 Lindsay Davenport defeated  Vera Zvonareva 6–3, 6–2
It was Lindsay Davenport's 2nd title of the year and her 10th overall.

Men's doubles

 Mark Knowles /  Daniel Nestor defeated  Jonas Björkman /  Todd Woodbridge, 6–2, 3–6, 6–3

Women's doubles

 Jill Craybas /  Marlene Weingärtner defeated  Emmanuelle Gagliardi /  Anna-Lena Grönefeld 7-5, 7-6(7–2)

External links
 
 Association of Tennis Professionals (ATP) tournament profile
 Men's Singles draw
 Men's Doubles draw
 Men's Qualifying Singles draw
 Women's Singles, Doubles and Qualifying Singles draws

 
Western and Southern Financial Group Masters
Western and Southern Financial Group Women's Open
Cincinnati Masters
Cincinnati Masters
Western and Southern Financial Group Masters